Associated Grocers of New England (AGNE) is a retailers' cooperative serving over six hundred independent grocery stores and convenience stores, in Connecticut, Maine, Massachusetts, New Hampshire, New York, Rhode Island, Vermont, and Pennsylvania. It was founded in 1946 as New Hampshire Wholesale Grocers and took the present name in 1969. AGNE is a member of Retailer Owned Food Distributors & Associates. It distributes Shurfine products in its stores. It is based in Pembroke, New Hampshire.

AGNE operates Vista Foods supermarkets in Laconia, New Hampshire and Newport, Vermont, Harvest Market in Bedford, Hollis and Wolfeboro New Hampshire, and Sully's Superette in Goffstown and Allenstown, New Hampshire.

External links 
 Associated Grocers of New England web site

Merrimack County, New Hampshire
New England
Economy of the Northeastern United States
American companies established in 1946
Retail companies established in 1946
Supermarkets of the United States
Retailers' cooperatives in the United States
1946 establishments in New Hampshire